Ib is a Danish masculine given name which may refer to:

 Ib Andersen (born 1954), Danish ballet dancer and choreographer
 Ib Braase (1923–2009), Danish sculptor
 Ib Eisner (1925–2003), Danish artist
 Ib Frederiksen, Danish former badminton player
 Ib Friis (born 1945), Danish professor of botany
 Ib Geertsen (1919–2009), Danish painter and sculptor
 Ib Glindemann (born 1934), Danish jazz musician and big band leader
 Ib Vagn Hansen (born 1926), Danish cyclist
 Ib Jacquet (born 1956), Danish former footballer
 Ib Larsen (born 1945), Danish rower, 1968 Summer Olympics bronze medalist in the coxless pairs
 Ib Madsen (born 1942), Danish mathematician and professor
 Ib Melchior (1917–2015), Danish-American novelist, short story writer, film producer, director and screenwriter
 Ib Mossin (1933–2004), Danish actor, singer and director
 Ib Nielsen (1919–1994), Danish fencer
 Ib Nørholm (born 1931), Danish composer and organist
 Ib Olsen (1929–2009), Danish rower, 1948 Summer Olympics bronze medalist in the coxed fours
 Ib Spang Olsen (1921–2012), Danish writer and illustrator
 Ib Schønberg (1902–1955), Danish film actor
 Ib Thomsen (born 1961), Norwegian politician

Danish masculine given names